Yeshwant Barde (born 15 February 1973) is an Indian former first-class cricketer. He is now an umpire and has stood in matches in the Ranji Trophy and the Indian Premier League.

References

External links
 

1973 births
Living people
Indian cricketers
Indian cricket umpires
Goa cricketers
People from Mapusa
Cricketers from Goa